Sinezona costulata is a species of minute sea snail, a marine gastropod mollusk or micromollusk in the family Scissurellidae, the little slit shells.

Description

Distribution

References

  Geiger D. & Sasaki T. (2009). New Scissurellidae and Anatomidae from Manazuru, Sagami Bay, and Okinawa, Japan (Mollusca: Gastropoda: Vetigastropoda). Molluscan Research 29 (1) : 1-16
 Geiger D.L. (2012) Monograph of the little slit shells. Volume 1. Introduction, Scissurellidae. pp. 1-728. Volume 2. Anatomidae, Larocheidae, Depressizonidae, Sutilizonidae, Temnocinclidae. pp. 729–1291. Santa Barbara Museum of Natural History Monographs Number 7.

Scissurellidae
Gastropods described in 2009